Raymond S. Lane, Jr. was a sculptor known for creating a series of hand-built clay sculptures about Harriet Tubman, an exhibit first displayed in the Public Library of Hamilton County titled "Harriet Tubman's Experience in the Underground Railroad". The sculptures currently are permanently loaned at the Harriet Beecher Stowe House in Cincinnati, Ohio, where they are on display.

Personal life 
Raymond S. Lane, Jr. was born in Cincinnati, in the West End. He attended St. Joseph’s School and Dyer School in the West End. His family moved to Walnut Hills, where he lived close to the Harriet Beecher Stowe House. As a child growing up In Walnut Hills, Raymond Lane attended Assumption School and Frederick Douglass Elementary School. He later attended the University of Cincinnati, studying art and sculpture.  Raised in a family that appreciated art, Raymond Lane was exposed to sculpting from family members, particularly his uncle Wallace Young. Building upon his family’s roots and his own effort and study, he became a teacher of sculpture. For decades, Mr. Lane worked in many different City of Cincinnati Recreation Centers, teaching sculpture to children, adults, and senior citizens. He continues to teach sculpture to individual students and in classes, including at various Cincinnati Recreation Centers.

Career 
Mr. Lane exhibited at the 1996 National Black Arts Festival in Atlanta, Ga. as part of the Olympics celebration. His works have been exhibited at Fifth Third Bank, WCET Gallery, and the Cincinnati Zoo and he has exhibited and sold his works at several United Negro College Fund functions. On permanent display at Northern Kentucky University is his mural, the "Slavery Experience Through the Middle Passage into the Underground Railroad."

"Harriet Tubman's Experience in the Underground Railroad" 
This series of sculptures tells the story of events that chronicle Harriet Tubman's legacy. The sculpture series begins with an adult reading the story of Harriet Tubman to a youngster. The remaining sculptures focus on events in Harriet Tubman’s experiences as a conductor on the Underground Railroad.  One sculpture depicts Mrs. Tubman with a lantern looking at a young slave hiding under a trap door. Another shows her guiding youngsters by boat, probably through a swamp, terrain typical of Maryland’s Eastern Shore, where Harriet Tubman was born a slave in about 1822.

The inspiration for this series came through Lane's visit to Harriet Tubman's house, who later research the life of Tubman while in Ohio. He worked on the sculptures in donated studio space in the basement of Assumption Church in Walnut Hills.

References

African-American sculptors
Living people
Artists from Cincinnati
University of Cincinnati alumni
Sculptors from Ohio
Year of birth missing (living people)
21st-century African-American people